The National Press Center stated in January 2001 that there were 507 newspapers and 157 magazines published in Uzbek language or Russian language.

Below is a list of newspapers published in Uzbekistan

Khalq Sozi - Uzbek language newspaper
Narodnoye Slovo - Russian language newspaper
 Novosti Uzbekistana - Russian language newspaper
Pravda Vostoka - Russian language newspaper
 Samarkand - weekly newspaper
 Zerkalo XXI - Russian language newspaper

References

Uzbekistan
 
Newspapers